Jean Boisselier (26 August 1912 – 26 February 1996) was a French archaeologist, ethnologist, and  art historian.  He was a specialist on Khmers and a researcher focused on Buddhist thought and iconography. As a member of the École française d'Extrême-Orient (EFEO), he was responsible for the restoration of Angkor.

Biography 
Boisselier was born in Paris, son of the military illustrator  and grandson of an architect. He then became a drawing teacher with the hope of joining the School of Cambodian Arts.

At the beginning of the World War II, he served as a reserve officer. In June 1940, he was taken prisoner by Germans. During his captivity, he kept contacts with the Guimet Museum and gave lectures of drawing and history of Khmer art. Upon his return to France after being released in 1945, he followed the courses given by Philippe Stern at the École du Louvre, where he graduated with a dissertation on the evolution of Khmer statuary.

In 1949, Boisselier travelled to Angkor to assist Henri Marchal for the conservation of Khmer monuments. He remained with Marchal only a few months, in 1950, he was appointed curator of the Museum of Phnom Penh where he set up a programme of restoration. After being a delegate of the École française d'Extrême-Orient in Cambodia in 1951, he was responsible for the scientific direction of the conservation work of Angkor in 1953. In 1955, he took part in the transfer of the management of the museum and the Buddhist Institute to the Cambodian authorities. He then left Cambodia for Thailand, where he discovered some murals from large pagodas, and studied the ancient city site of U Thong and the Dvaravati period.

Back in Paris, he resigned from the EFEO to join the Centre national de la recherche scientifique (CNRS). From 1964, he resumed specific missions in Thailand, where he gave numerous lectures at the Silpakorn University and participated in the excavations of Dambegoda in Buttala Divisional Secretariat, Sri Lanka. He was appointed Docteur Honoris Causa of the Silpakorn University in 1983.

He has published a number of works on Southeast Asian art and religion, including a pocket-sized book——for Gallimard's "Découvertes" collection, which has been translated into 14 languages, including English.

Selected publications 
 La statuaire khmère et son évolution. Saigon, EFEO (PEFEO, 37) 1955
 Tendances de l’Art khmer. Commentaires sur 24 chefs-d’œuvre du musée de Phnom Penh Paris, PUF (Publ. du musée Guimet, Bibliothèque de diffusion, 42) 1956
 La statuaire du Champa. Recherches sur les cultes et l’iconographie. Paris, EFEO (PEFEO, 54) 1963
 Asie du Sud-Est : I. Le Cambodge. Paris, Picard (Manuel d’archéologie d’Extrême-Orient, 1) 1966
 Notes sur l'art du bronze dans l'ancien Cambodge . Artibus Asiae 29/4. 1967
 La sculpture en Thaïlande. Fribourg, Office du Livre (Bibliothèque des Arts). 1974
 With Jean-Michel Beurdeley, La peinture en Thaïlande. Fribourg, Office du livre (Bibliothèque des Arts). 1976, deutsche Version: Malerei in Thailand. W. Kohlhammer, Stuttgart 1976, 
 Il Sud-Est asiatico. Turin, Storia Universale dell’ Arte. 1986
 La sagesse du Bouddha, collection « Découvertes Gallimard » (nº 194), série Religions. Éditions Gallimard, 1993,  (new editions in 2010, 2019)
 UK edition – The Wisdom of the Buddha, 'New Horizons' series. Thames & Hudson, 1994
 US edition – The Wisdom of the Buddha, "Abrams Discoveries" series. Harry N. Abrams, 1994
 Bouddha, collection "Albums Beaux Livres". Éditions Gallimard, 2013 (preface by Trinh Xuan Thuan; an adaptation of La sagesse du Bouddha)

References 

1912 births
1996 deaths
Archaeologists from Paris
French art historians
French ethnologists
École du Louvre alumni
École des Beaux-Arts alumni
20th-century French archaeologists